New Hampshire's 3rd congressional district is an obsolete district. It was organized from the State's At-Large District in 1847.  It was eliminated after the 1880 Census. The last representative serving the district was Ossian Ray.

List of members representing the district

References 
 
 
 Congressional Biographical Directory of the United States 1774–present

Former congressional districts of the United States
03